Tidjani Amadou Moutari Kalala  (born 19 January 1994) is a Nigerien professional footballer who plays as a midfielder for Turkish club Tuzlaspor.

Club career
Born in Arlit, Moutari spent his early career in Niger and France for Akokana and Le Mans B.

In January 2014, Moutari signed for Metalurh Donetsk in the Ukrainian Premier League, thus becoming the first Nigerien to play in that league.

In July, Moutari signed a four-year contract with Russian club Anzhi Makhachkala.

On 25 January 2017, Moutari signed a contract with Hungarian club Ferencváros.  

On 13 February 2019, Moutari signed a contract with Hungarian club Mezőkövesd.

On 29 May, Moutari signed a contract with Hungarian club Budapest Honvéd.

On 10 October 2020, Moutari signed a contract with Saudi club Al-Ain.

On 31 August 2021, Moutari signed a two-year contract with Saudi club Al-Fayha.

On 31 August 2022, Moutari signed a contract with Saudi club Al-Qadsiah. On 31 January 2023, Moutari was released by Al-Qadsiah.

International career
He made his international debut for Niger in 2012, and while competing at the 2012 Africa Cup of Nations broke his leg in a match against Gabon.

Career statistics

Club

International

International goals

Niger score listed first, score column indicates score after each Moutari goal.

References

1994 births
People from Agadez Region
Living people
Nigerien footballers
Niger international footballers
Association football midfielders
Akokana FC players
Le Mans FC players
FC Metalurh Donetsk players
FC Anzhi Makhachkala players
Ferencvárosi TC footballers
Mezőkövesdi SE footballers
Budapest Honvéd FC players
Al-Ain FC (Saudi Arabia) players
Al-Fayha FC players
Al-Qadsiah FC players
Tuzlaspor players
Super Ligue (Niger) players
Championnat National 2 players
Ukrainian Premier League players
Russian Premier League players
Nemzeti Bajnokság I players
Saudi Professional League players
Saudi First Division League players
TFF First League players
2012 Africa Cup of Nations players
2013 Africa Cup of Nations players
Nigerien expatriate footballers
Nigerien expatriate sportspeople in France
Expatriate footballers in France
Nigerien expatriate sportspeople in Ukraine
Expatriate footballers in Ukraine
Nigerien expatriate sportspeople in Russia
Expatriate footballers in Russia
Nigerien expatriate sportspeople in Hungary
Expatriate footballers in Hungary
Nigerien expatriate sportspeople in Saudi Arabia
Expatriate footballers in Saudi Arabia
Nigerien expatriate sportspeople in Turkey
Expatriate footballers in Turkey